In Greek mythology, Criasus (Ancient Greek: Κρίασος Kriasos) was a king of Argos.

Family 
Criasus was the son of Argus and Evadne (daughter of Strymon) or the Oceanid Peitho. He had five brothers who were named Ecbasus, Jasus, Peiranthus, Epidaurus and Tiryns. Criasus fathered Phorbas, Ereuthalion and Cleoboea by Melantho.

Mythology 
Criasus was said to have reigned for fifty four years. During his reign, Callithyia, daughter of Peiranthus, became the first priestess of Hera. According to Eusebius, Criasus reigned at the same time as Saphrus reigned as the fourteenth king of Assyria, and Orthopolis as the twelfth king of Sicyon. Eusebius also tells us that Moses was born in Egypt during his reign. Criasus' son Phorbas succeeded him on the throne of Argos.

Notes

Princes in Greek mythology
Kings of Argos
Kings in Greek mythology
Inachids
Mythology of Argos

References 

 Apollodorus, The Library with an English Translation by Sir James George Frazer, F.B.A., F.R.S. in 2 Volumes, Cambridge, MA, Harvard University Press; London, William Heinemann Ltd. 1921. ISBN 0-674-99135-4. Online version at the Perseus Digital Library. Greek text available from the same website.
 Gaius Julius Hyginus, Fabulae from The Myths of Hyginus translated and edited by Mary Grant. University of Kansas Publications in Humanistic Studies. Online version at the Topos Text Project.